Merrillville  is a town in Ross Township, Lake County, Indiana, United States. The population was 35,246 at the 2010 census. Merrillville is in east-central Lake County, in the Chicago metropolitan area. On January 1, 2015, Merrillville became the most populated town in Indiana, as Fishers in Hamilton County was converted from a town to a city. The town serves as a major shopping hub for Northwest Indiana.

Geography

The town is centered on the intersection of U.S. Route 30 and Interstate 65.

The Lincoln Highway runs through Merrillville. The original alignment of Lincoln Highway is known as 73rd Avenue (also called Old Lincoln Highway) in Merrillville, while the current Lincoln Highway (US 30) is known as 81st Avenue. State Road 53 (Broadway) and State Road 55 (Taft Street) traverse the town from north to south.

Merrillville's asymmetric shape results in numerous boundaries with other municipalities. It is bordered by Gary and unincorporated Calumet Township, Lake County, to the north; Hobart to the northeast; Union Township, Porter County, to the east; Winfield and Crown Point to the south; Schererville to the west; and Griffith to the northwest.

History
Merrillville occupies what used to be woodland belonging to the Potawatomi Indians. In 1834, a clearing was created for ceremonial purposes and called McGwinn Village. A year later, a white man, Jeremiah Wiggins, settled in the place; McGwinn Village became Wiggins Point.

Wiggins Point became a well-known stop for wagon trains heading to Joliet, Illinois along the Sauk Trail (also called the Sac Trail), an old Indian trail. At one time, 16 trails radiated outward from Wiggins Point. In 1838, Wiggins died. Sometime afterward, local settlers renamed the place Centerville. Later still, it was renamed Merrillville after the brothers Dudley and William Merrill. Dudley Merrill operated a hotel and store in Centerville, and his son John P. Merrill was a Township Trustee.

Nearby, in the same former Potawatomi hunting grounds, other settlements had sprung up. Near Deep River creek was a settlement named Deep River; near Turkey Creek was another settlement with that creek's name. Others included Ainsworth, Lottaville, and Rexville. At one time, the post office for the area was named Lottaville.

In 1848, all of these settlements, including Merrillville (that is, the old McGwinn Village) were collected into one and called Ross Township. As time went by, bits and pieces of Ross Township were taken by Hobart and Crown Point when those towns incorporated.

In 1971, the area officially became Merrillville (which now includes the old Merrillville as well as other settlements nearby) and was incorporated as a town under Indiana law. During this time, the majority of the town's growth was due to white flight from Gary.

In 1993, Merrillville tried to annex unincorporated Winfield Township to get more land. The residents blocked Merrillville by creating the town of Winfield.

In 2009, a pedestrian bridge at Hidden Lake Park collapsed, injuring at least 25 people The catastrophe occurred around 10 PM after the annual Fourth of July fireworks display, when several dozen people attempted to cross the wood suspension bridge. Police officers stationed at either side of the bridge were unable to stop the advancing parkgoers, and with numerous people jumping up and down the 30-year-old bridge collapsed, sending somewhere around 50 people into the waters of Hidden Lake.

The Morgan-Skinner-Boyd Homestead and John Wood Old Mill are listed in the National Register of Historic Places.

Economy
Merrillville is a hub for retail trade in Northwest Indiana. The US 30 corridor between Taft Street and Colorado Street harbors a large concentration of big-box retailers, hotels, restaurants, and automobile dealerships.

Ameriplex at the Crossroads, an industrial and technology park, opened at Broadway between 93rd Avenue and 101st Avenue in 2005. The development is designated an Indiana Certified Technology Park and includes a business incubator and technology center operated by the Purdue Research Foundation.

Heavy industry such as steelmaking and petroleum refining, which characterizes the economy of northern Lake County, does not have a significant presence in Merrillville. The town is home to the corporate headquarters of Fortune 500 energy company NiSource, hospitality management firm White Lodging, and Centier Bank, Indiana's largest privately owned independent bank.

Merrillville's nearest commercial airports are Griffith-Merrillville Airport in Griffith and Gary/Chicago International Airport in Gary.

Demographics

2010 census
As of the census of 2010, there were 35,246 people, 13,696 households, and 9,016 families living in the town. The racial makeup of the town was 46.4% White, 44.5% African American, 0.2% Native American, 1.2% Asian, 4.6% from other races, and 3.2% from two or more races. Hispanic or Latino of any race were 12.9% of the population.

There were 13,696 households, of which 34.1% had children under the age of 18 living with them, 42.3% were married couples living together, 17.9% had a female householder with no husband present, 5.6% had a male householder with no wife present, and 34.2% were non-families. 29.7% of all households were made up of individuals, and 11.8% had someone living alone who was 65 years of age or older. The average household size was 2.54 and the average family size was 3.16.

The median age in the town was 36.7 years. 25.5% of residents were under the age of 18; 8.6% were between the ages of 18 and 24; 26.8% were from 25 to 44; 25.5% were from 45 to 64; and 13.7% were 65 years of age or older. The gender makeup of the town was 47.0% male and 53.0% female.

As of 2010, the median income for a household in the town was $49,469 while the mean income for a household in the town was $57,728. The median income for a family was $56,911 and the mean income for a family was $65,925. The estimated per capita income for the town was $22,993. About 8.9% of families and 12.0% of the population were estimated to be below the poverty line.

2000 census
As of the census of 2000, there were 30,560 people, 11,678 households, and 8,127 families living in the town. The racial makeup of the town was 69.65% White, 22.86% African American, 0.33% Native American, 1.51% Asian, 0.02% Pacific Islander, 3.39% from other races, and 2.24% from two or more races. Hispanic or Latino of any race were 9.65% of the population.

There were 11,678 households, out of which 32.2% had children under the age of 18 living with them, 52.9% were married couples living together, 12.6% had a female householder with no husband present, and 30.4% were non-families. 26.1% of all households were made up of individuals, and 11.8% had someone living alone who was 65 years of age or older. The average household size was 2.57 and the average family size was 3.12.

In the town, the population was spread out, with 24.6% under the age of 18, 8.7% from 18 to 24, 29.4% from 25 to 44, 22.2% from 45 to 64, and 15.1% who were 65 years of age or older. The median age was 37 years. For every 100 females, there were 91.2 males. For every 100 females age 18 and over, there were 86.7 males.

The median income for a household in the town was $49,545, and the median income for a family was $56,355. Males had a median income of $41,820 versus $29,005 for females. The per capita income for the town was $22,293. About 2.6% of families and 4.3% of the population were below the poverty line, including 4.1% of those under age 18 and 5.5% of those age 65 or over.

Transportation
Barons Bus Lines services Merrillville seven days per week as part of schedule 0025, westbound, with local service between Cleveland, Ohio and Chicago, Illinois. 

Gary Public Transportation Corporation provides bus service along the Broadway Avenue Corridor and within the US 30 retail/office corridor. Those routes are partially funded by Northwest Indiana Regional Bus Authority. The closest South Shore Line station is in downtown Gary and can be reached using GPTC Route 17 or Barons Bus schedule 0025. The closest Amtrak station is in Dyer, Indiana. It cannot be directly reached by public transit.

Education
Public education in the town is provided by the Merrillville Community School Corporation. Andrean High School, a Roman Catholic institution operated by the Diocese of Gary, is also in Merrillville.

Lake County Public Library operates the Central Library at 1919 West 81st Avenue in Merrillville.

References

External links
 Official website
 Merrillville Historical Society website
 Merrillville Chamber of Commerce

 
Towns in Lake County, Indiana
Towns in Indiana
Northwest Indiana
Chicago metropolitan area
Populated places established in 1834
1834 establishments in Indiana